Puerto Rico Highway 105 (PR-105) is a road that travels from Mayagüez, Puerto Rico to Maricao. It begins at its intersection with PR-239 (former PR-2R) in downtown Mayagüez and ends at its junction with PR-128 in eastern Maricao, close to Yauco municipal limit.

Major intersections

See also

 List of highways numbered 105

References

External links
 

105